Alexander Bazdrigiannis (born 18 February 2002) is a German footballer who plays as a forward for 1. FC Schweinfurt 05.

Personal life
Born in Germany, Bazdrigiannis is of Greek descent.

Career statistics

References

2002 births
Living people
German people of Greek descent
German footballers
Greek footballers
Association football forwards
3. Liga players
TSV 1860 Munich players
FC Bayern Munich footballers
SC Freiburg players
SC Freiburg II players
1. FC Schweinfurt 05 players